Glipidiomorpha burgeoni is a species of beetle in the genus Glipidiomorpha of the family Mordellidae. It was described in 1929 by Píc.

References

Beetles described in 1929
Mordellidae